Georgică Donici (born 27 April 1957) is a retired Romanian amateur boxer. He competed in the light-heavyweight division at the 1980 and 1984 Olympics and was eliminated in quarterfinals on both occasions.

References

1957 births
Living people
Sportspeople from Galați
Boxers at the 1980 Summer Olympics
Boxers at the 1984 Summer Olympics
Olympic boxers of Romania
Romanian male boxers
Light-heavyweight boxers